Segré-en-Anjou Bleu (literally Segré in Blue Anjou) is a commune in the Maine-et-Loire department of western France. The municipality was established on 15 December 2016 and consists of the former communes of Aviré, Le Bourg-d'Iré, La Chapelle-sur-Oudon, Châtelais, La Ferrière-de-Flée, L'Hôtellerie-de-Flée, Louvaines, Marans, Montguillon, Noyant-la-Gravoyère, Nyoiseau, Sainte-Gemmes-d'Andigné, Saint-Martin-du-Bois, Saint-Sauveur-de-Flée and Segré. It is a subprefecture of the Maine-et-Loire department.

Population

See also 
Communes of the Maine-et-Loire department

References 

Communes of Maine-et-Loire
Subprefectures in France
Anjou